WCKI (1300 AM) is a radio station operating on 1300 kHz in Greer, South Carolina, United States. Broadcasting Catholic programming, WCKI is owned and operated by Mediatrix Radio.

External links
 

CKI
Catholic radio stations
Radio stations established in 1955
1955 establishments in South Carolina